William Nassau de Zuylestein may refer to:
William Nassau de Zuylestein, 1st Earl of Rochford (1649–1708)
William Nassau de Zuylestein, 2nd Earl of Rochford
William Nassau de Zuylestein, 4th Earl of Rochford
William Nassau de Zuylestein, 5th Earl of Rochford